Nathlie Provosty (born 1981 in Cincinnati, Ohio), is an American visual artist in Brooklyn, New York. She earned her bachelor's degree in Fine Arts at University of Maryland Institute College of Art in 2004. The year after graduation from college, Provosty received a Fulbright Fellowship in painting, and spent a year in India. In 2007, She earned her Master's degree in Fine Arts at University of Pennsylvania.

In 2013, Provosty created an artwork for an album named Aheym by the musician Bryce Dessner. In 2014, she collaborated with the poet Robert Kelly and create a group of paintings for Kelly's book The Color Mill.

Provosty was the recipient of the Rosenthal Family Foundation Award for Painting in 2012.

In 2012, Provosty had her first one-person exhibition at "1:1", an experimental artist-run gallery in New York. Her first exhibition in a commercial gallery was held at Nathalie Karg Gallery in New York in 2016. Her work is in the collection of the San Francisco Museum of Modern Art the Albright-Knox Art Gallery, and MoMA.

Painting style 
Provosty is well-known for her oil painting on linen. By using monochromatic shades of color, she often creates schemes that appear aesthetically simple but contain depths of field. She often applies colors in glossy and matte finishes of paint to highlight this effect, which helps to draw viewers into and across the works’ layers.

Provosty also utilizes various media in her works. In the 2016 exhibition at Nathalie Karg Gallery in New York, Provosty created an expanded multi-sensory experience by manipulating colors at the far reach of the spectrum and the surfaces that vibrate and disappear.

Exhibitions 
Provosty's paintings have been exhibited all over the world, including Baltimore Museum of Art, Colby Museum of Art, the Farnsworth Museum, and the Portland Museum of Art.

Solo exhibitions 

 2018–2019, Museo del Risorgimento, Turin, Italy 
 2018, Slow Time, Nathalie Karg Gallery, New York 
 2016, Bischoff Projects, Frankfurt, Germany 
 2016, The Third Ear, Nathalie Karg Gallery, New York 
 2015, Jablonka Maruani Mercier Gallery Project Space, Knokke, Belgium

Group exhibitions 

 2018, Kunsthall Stavanger, Norway 
 2017, Visionary Painting: Curated by Alex Katz, the Colby Museum of Art, Maine
 2017, the Washington University Museum, Washington, D.C.
 2016, A Way of Living, A Palazzo Gallery in Brescia, Italy

References

External links 
 Carrie Moyer and the Recent Past Anna Leonhardt, R. J. Messineo, and Nathlie Provosty. Haberarts
 Alex Bacon. Nathlie Provosty’s New Paintings. The Miami Rail

1981 births
Living people
21st-century American women artists
American realist painters
American contemporary painters